Dhaka Custom House is a Bangladesh government regulatory agency under the Ministry of Finance responsible for enforcing tariffs and customs on shipments in Dhaka. It is the largest airport customs house in Bangladesh. Md. Mosharraf Hossain Bhuiyan is in charge of Dhaka Custom House.

History
The East India Company in 1810 reorganized Bengal's age old system of internal duties levied on the passage of goods. The numerous customs houses in Bengal were consolidated into six: Calcutta, Murshidabad, Hughli, Dhaka, Chittagong, and Balassore.

Dhaka Custom House systems were automated with the support of Dhaka Chamber of Commerce and Industry as part of public–private partnership. The custom house routinely recovers large quantity of gold being smuggled through Dhaka airport.

References

Further reading
 
 

Organisations based in Dhaka
Government agencies of Bangladesh
Custom houses
Foreign trade of Bangladesh